Olivia King (born 25 January 2001) is a New Zealand track cyclist.

Initially a road cyclist, University of Waikato student Olivia King began transitioning to track racing and by 2019 was selected for the Junior Track World Championships held in Germany.

King was a gold medalist at the 2022 Commonwealth Games in the Women’s Team sprint competition.

References

 

2001 births
Living people
New Zealand female cyclists
New Zealand track cyclists
21st-century New Zealand people
Cyclists at the 2022 Commonwealth Games
Commonwealth Games gold medallists for New Zealand
21st-century New Zealand women
Commonwealth Games medallists in cycling
Medallists at the 2022 Commonwealth Games